The 1991 Salem Open was a men's tennis tournament played on outdoor hard courts on Hong Kong Island in Hong Kong that was part of the World Series of the 1991 ATP Tour. It was the 16th edition of the tournament and was held from 23 April through 29 April 1991. Unseeded Richard Krajicek won the singles title.

Finals

Singles
 Richard Krajicek defeated  Wally Masur 6–2, 3–6, 6–3
 It was Krajicek's only singles title of the year and the first of his career.

Doubles
 Patrick Galbraith /  Todd Witsken defeated  Glenn Michibata /  Robert Van't Hof 6–2, 6–4
 It was Galbraith's 2nd doubles title of the year and the 5th of his career. It was Witsken's 1st doubles title of the year and the 9th of his career.

References

External links
 ITF tournament edition details

Salem Open
Hong Kong Open (tennis)
1991 in Hong Kong sport